John Stokes (died 1568) was Archdeacon of York from 1560 to 1568; and also President of Queens' College, Cambridge during the same period.

Notes

Archdeacons of York
Presidents of Queens' College, Cambridge
1568 deaths